Yang Ming Marine Transport Corporation is a Taiwanese container shipping company based in Keelung, Taiwan (ROC).

History
The company was founded in 1972 as a shipping line, but has historical links through its merger with the China Merchants Steam Navigation Company (1872–1995), which dates back to the Qing Dynasty. 

In between July and September 2018, Yang Ming agreed to offer a service from the Port of Keelung, Taiwan, to the US for two batches of nearly 20 containers each, containing over 1700 unused nuclear fuel rods, after the Taiwan Power Company decided to close its fourth nuclear plant. Safety concerns for possible leakage of radioactive materials were raised, and the first shipment was attended by over 200 police officers and company officers.

On 10 March 2019, Yang Ming has welcomed two additional 14,000 TEU vessels in its fleet, YM Warranty and YM Wellspring.
The ships have been built in Japan at Imabari Shipbuilding, at a cost of nearly $99 million each. The additional tonnage is composed of sisters of the previously delivered YM Wellbeing, YM Wonderland and YM Wisdom.

In May 2019, under the scope of improving its network, an agreement with the Canadian Pacific Railway was reached to have containers moved by rail from the Port of Vancouver eastbound to all Canada.

Subsidiaries 
The Yang Ming Group includes a logistics unit (Yes Logistics Corp. and Jing Ming Transport Co.), container terminals in Taiwan, Belgium, Netherlands and the USA, as well as stevedoring services (Port of Kaohsiung, Taiwan). Yang Ming's service scope covers over 70 nations with more than 170 service points

THE Alliance

Along with Hapag-Lloyd, HMM Co Ltd, and Ocean Network Express, Yang Ming Marine Transport Corporation is a member of THE Alliance. THE Alliance is intended to provide 34 services, directly calling at 81 different ports on a monthly basis.

Fleet 
As of mid-2019, Yang Ming operated a fleet of over 4.2-million-D.W.T / operating capacity 643 thousand TEU, of which container ships are the main service force.

Accidents and incidents

YM Efficiency 
On 4 June 2018, the container ship YM Efficiency lost 83 containers at sea due to extreme rough weather conditions close to Australia, New South Wales coast,
that made the cargo break their lashing and fall into the waters.
A safety warning had to be issued, as despite the fact that no dangerous goods were discharged into the sea, some medical and surgical items were noted floating and then recovered ashore, polluting a number of beaches.

See also
 List of companies of Taiwan
 Top intermodal container companies list
 Maersk Dubai incident
 YM Museum of Marine Exploration Kaohsiung
 YM Oceanic Culture and Art Museum

References

External links

 

1972 establishments in Taiwan
Companies based in Keelung
Container shipping companies
Multinational companies headquartered in Taiwan
Shipping companies of Taiwan
Taiwanese brands
Transport companies established in 1972